Stormblade may refer to:

 Stormblade (album), an album by Demoniac
 Stormblade (novel), the second novel in the Heroes trilogy of the Dragonlance novels
 Stormblade (spell), a storm spell in the online game of Wizard101
Stormblades, an on-rails action game published by Kiloo